Backflip Studios was a mobile game developer and publisher based in Boulder, Colorado, United States. It was founded by Julian Farrior, Dale Thoms and Tom Blind in April 2009. In August 2009, it was announced that the company had raised US$145,000 in funding to continue developing for the iPhone OS. Backflip Studios was best known for their free mobile game Paper Toss, which has been downloaded over 50 million times. They are also widely known for Dragonvale, with over 10 million downloads. In 2013, Backflip Studios sold a 70% stake in the company to Hasbro for $112 million in cash.

The studio closed on October 24, 2019.

Games

Ragdoll Blaster
Ragdoll Blaster is a physics game in which players solve puzzles by shooting targets with rag dolls and a cannon.

Paper Toss
Paper Toss is a casual mobile game, set in an office. The player's objective is to flick a piece of paper into a bin. To make the game more challenging, there is a fan running in the space, thus the wind direction and speed are displayed, as they need to be accounted for when flicking the piece of paper. Players are scored on how many times they manage to toss the paper into the bin before missing. There are online leaderboards and different levels with varying distances away from the bin. 

A sequel titled Paper Toss: World Tour follows the same objective, but is set in different locations around the world. There are 8 different levels ranging in difficulty. It was released exclusively on the iOS and was never ported to Android.

A follow-up of the original, Paper Toss 2.0 (later retitled Paper Toss Boss) also follows the same objective. The follow-up includes new locations, diverse objects to toss and special features. The new locations that appear in this game include a warehouse, the Boss' Office where a sleepy boss lies, and an airport terminal. The number items apart from the paper ball, that are available have also increased with the option of using various food items and household objects and grenades as well. The game also presents special new graphic features that were missing in the first version such as colleagues who can be hit with the paper balls or drawers, fish tanks and boxes that break open. Another speciality is the Intern level, where an intern carries the dustbin with himself as he slides across the office on his chair. Here, the player has to not only adjust the angle of the throw with the air current, but also time the intern's movement correctly to get the ball in. The game also features an achievement list which can be synced with Game Center and Google Play Games.

All three games have been removed from the app stores as of September 9, 2019 and are no longer supported.

Harbor Havoc 3D
Harbor Havoc 3D is a simulation game in which players direct marine traffic to their proper ports.

Ragdoll Blaster 2
Ragdoll Blaster 2 is a physics game in which players solve puzzles by shooting targets with rag dolls and a cannon. It is the sequel of Ragdoll Blaster.

Strike Knight
Strike Knight  was a simulation game which is based on real life puck bowling arcade games of the 80s and 90s.

Graffiti Ball
Graffiti Ball  is a physics game which is based around a graffiti theme. You have to draw lines on a wall to get a bouncing ball to each level's exit point as quickly as possible.

Tunnel Shoot
Tunnel Shoot is a shooter developed by Backflip Studios and Team Phobic. In Tunnel Shoot, you pilot a ship down an endless, colorful, vector-drawn tunnel filled with obstacles and enemies.

NinJump
NinJump is a climber game. The player, as a ninja, climbs up the walls on the sides of the screen while dodging protruding objects and attacking things in the air.

Army of Darkness: Defense

Army of Darkness: Defense is a casual castle defense game based on the MGM classic movie, in which you play Ash, a time-traveling, evil-fighting, S-Mart sales clerk as you defend Lord Arthur's castle and the Necronomicon from the oncoming hordes of evil undead.

DragonVale

DragonVale is a breeding simulation application in which players design a dragon park and display dragons that they breed in habitats in order to earn 'dragoncash' and gems. Dragons earn dragoncash while staying in their habitat. Different dragons earn at different rates depending upon their type and level. Dragoncash can be used to upgrade a park with new islands, habitats, and decorations. It can also be used to buy and grow 'treats' which the player can feed to their dragons in order to level them up, resulting in them earning a higher rate of dragoncash. Currently the game has a maximum park level of 170; and there is a total dragon count of 736, decoration count of 542, and island count of 34, excluding special larger islands. The game also has an online aspect in that players can add friends who they can send gifts to and breed dragons with. Backflip later added another realm to the game called the 'Rift' which players could use to collect dragons with animated 'traits' which produced a new currency called 'Etherium' which is used in the Rift to expand the player's 'Riftspace' . The game is now developed by DECA Games and continues to run to this day under their development. 

DragonVale spawned many spin-off games made by Backflip Studios including: Dragonvale Wings, an endurance side-scroller mobile game, Dragonvale World, a now defunct sequel to Dragonvale with 3D graphics, and Dragonvale Pop, a puzzle game.

Buganoids
Buganoids is an action arcade game where you play as a little astronaut and shoot bugs on each planet.

NinJump Deluxe
NinJump Deluxe is an action game and the sequel of NinJump. The player, as a ninja, climbing up walls on the sides of the screen while dodging protruding objects and attacking things in the air. This version has three new levels.

Backflip Slots
Backflip Slots is a casino slot machine game in which you win cash, prizes and use bonus buddies. It also has the appearances of characters from other Backflip Studios games.

Mahjongg Dimensions
Mahjongg Dimensions is a puzzle game in which you have to match images and clear the blocks as quickly as possible.

Shape Shift
Shape Shift is a simulation puzzle game in which you swap shapes with the same colors in unlimited levels.

Solitaire by Backflip
Solitaire by Backflip is a solitaire simulation game in which you can play Vegas style, or traditional one and three card draw Solitaire. It's complete with different card themes, like Ragdoll Blaster, and a prizes display case.

Ragdoll Blaster 3
Ragdoll Blaster 3 is a physics game in which players solve puzzles by shooting targets with rag dolls and a cannon. It's the third installment of the Ragdoll Blaster franchise.

Gizmonauts
Gizmonauts is similar to Dragonvale, in that the player breeds, feeds and battles with bots instead of dragons.

Outworded
Outworded is a word search game with both single player and multiplayer game modes. Puzzle’s difficulty settings increase the puzzle’s size. Multiplayer mode allows players to challenge friends to see who can solve puzzles the fastest.

Ferno
Ferno is a simulation game where you move your piece around a dark space-like board and collect orange flaming bolts to grow your piece, and your score. With 10 waves of fiery madness, you can grow your way to the top spot in the leaderboards.

Dragonvale Wings
Dragonvale Wings is a flight simulation game, similar to the hit "Flappy Bird", where you play a young fire dragon from Dragonvale. Navigate your way through the floating islands, collecting coins and gems for more points.

NinJump Smash
NinJump Smash is an arcade style game where you play as the famous NinJump ninja, breaking through walls to reach the highest score.

DragonVale World 
DragonVale World is an offshoot of the popular DragonVale game. It features many of the same aspects as Dragonvale but with different dragons. Expand and decorate your park to your liking. Collect rare dragons by breeding and buying. Build fantastic buildings and habitats to generate more wealth. The game was discontinued when Backflip Studios was closed in 2019.

Band Together 
Band Together is a puzzle game set inside a cardboard box. You try to keep little cardboard creatures, named "Bandies", alive during different obstacles like thumbtacks or baseballs. You lead the creatures through the level trying to keep them alive. The game outlines a curious child's life who is experimenting with the little beings. The Bandies come in different forms, being in their normal form, sleeping, or with a candle upon its head.

Awards 
In 2012, Backflip Studios was recognized by 9News KUSA Denver as one of "50 Colorado Companies to Watch".

Apple recognized DragonVale as the #1 Top Grossing iPad app and the #4 Top Grossing iPhone app of 2012.

References

External links
Official website

Former Hasbro subsidiaries
Video game development companies
Video game publishers
Video game companies established in 2009
Video game companies disestablished in 2019
2013 mergers and acquisitions
Defunct video game companies of the United States
Mobile game companies
Defunct companies based in Colorado
Companies based in Boulder, Colorado